Alyssa Bonagura (born April 1, 1988) is an American singer-songwriter.

Early life and career
Alyssa Bonagura is from Franklin, Tennessee. She is the daughter of singers Michael Bonagura and Kathie Baillie of Baillie & the Boys. She has been singing since the age of 2 and is a multi-instrumentalist. At the age of 10, she was asked by Kenny Rogers to sing a duet with him on his Christmas album Christmas From The Heart. She was awarded the Sennheiser Scholarship which allowed her to graduate from Liverpool Institute of Performing Arts with a degree in sound technology in 2009. She performed back up vocals in "That Old Glass Case" on her mother's 2006 album Love's Funny That Way. While studying in England from 2006 to 2009, she became a temporary member of Pete Wylie and The Mighty Wah! and played at such events as the 2007 Queens Variety Show in Liverpool, England at the Empire Theatre, and Knowsley Hall Music Festival alongside acts such as The Who, The Coral, and The Thrills. She performed at the 2008 European Capital of Culture event, Liverpool: the Musical – the event which inaugurated Liverpool's new Echo Arena with Ringo Starr.

In 2010, Bonagura signed with Rondor Music International (A division of Universal Music) as a songwriter and has successfully written songs for Raquel Castro's debut single "Diary". In 2011, Sarah Jarosz released a single that she co-wrote with Bonagura called "Run Away." She's also co-written the song "Keeping Secrets" with Tyler Ward on his 2012 album Hello. Love. Heartbreak. and "Like U" for Kaya Jones.

She has produced artists including Jo Dee Messina and Jessie James Decker. Bonagura co-wrote, produced, and was featured on the song "Unbreakable", 
the first song Messina has released since her split from a major label. Jessie James' version of Bonagura's song "Nothing More To Say" was featured on Perez Hilton's blog site in 2010.

In 2012, her song "I Make My Own Sunshine" was used in a Lowe's commercial. Her debut album Love Hard was released on October 30, 2012.

Penned by Bonagura, her father Michael, and Matthew and Gunnar Nelson, the single, "This Christmas", is the title-track of Nelson's album and marks their first return on a Billboard chart in more than 20 years. "This Christmas" debuted at #22 on the Adult Contemporary chart on December 12, 2015.

On March 13, 2016, Bonagura performed with bandmate Ruby Stewart at the CMC Rocks festival in Queensland, Australia. Billing themselves as The Sisterhood, the two had been working together for a year after Rod Stewart told them, "you two should start a band, your voices are good together." The two performed a one-hour set with backing by the Morgan Evans band.

Discography

Albums
2008 Before the Breaking (EP)
2010 The English Diaries
2012 Love Hard
2016 Road Less Traveled

Singles
2011 "Killing Me" (feat. Tyler Wilkinson)
2012 "I Make My Own Sunshine"
2012 "Nothing More to Say"
2021 “New Wings“

Music videos

As a writer and producer

Notes

References

External links
Official website

1988 births
People from Franklin, Tennessee
American women singer-songwriters
Singer-songwriters from Tennessee
Living people
Alumni of the Liverpool Institute for Performing Arts
21st-century American women singers